KMAH-LP, UHF analog channel 39, was a low-powered Cornerstone Television-affiliated television station licensed to Cheyenne, Wyoming, United States. The station was owned by local businessman Bob Rule, owner of Rule Communications.

History
Originally, KMAH-LP was an affiliate of FamilyNet, also carrying programming from National Empowerment Television, a conservative news channel. Later on, it became a full-time repeater of WPCB in Pittsburgh, carrying the Cornerstone Television Network. Then, after KKRR-LP came on the air, it became an affiliate for the short-lived Renaissance Network, and when that network failed, it became an affiliate of America One. After America One proved too expensive for the station, it again became an affiliate of Cornerstone.

KMAH-LP's license was canceled by the Federal Communications Commission (FCC) on July 20, 2021, as the station failed to obtain a license for digital operation by the July 13 deadline.

MAH-LP
Television channels and stations established in 1994
1994 establishments in Wyoming
Defunct television stations in the United States
Television channels and stations disestablished in 2021
2021 disestablishments in Wyoming
MAH-LP